Tshepo Gumede (born 21 April 1991) is a South African professional footballer who plays for Marumo Gallants (formerly Tshakhuma Tsha Madzivhandila Football Club) as a defender.

Club career
Gumede began his youth career at Arcadia Shepherds before joining the SuperSport United academy. He spent a season on loan at Mpumalanga Black Aces but failed to make an appearance.

Gumede joined Platinum Stars in July 2012. At the end of the 2012–13 season, he was nominated for the ABSA Premiership Young Player of the Year award and the Nedbank Cup Most Promising Player of the Tournament award, winning the former.

On 26 July 2016 it was announced that Gumede had joined Capetonian side Cape Town City. In June 2018 Gumede left the club, with the club not renewing his contract. Gumede would go on to join AmaZulu in February 2019, this after spending a period of time on trial with the club.

International career
Gumede was part of the South Africa squad for the 2013 COSAFA Cup and made his debut against Namibia.

Personal life
He was born in Dobsonville.

References

External links
 
 

1991 births
Living people
South African Premier Division players
SuperSport United F.C. players
Mpumalanga Black Aces F.C. players
Platinum Stars F.C. players
Orlando Pirates F.C. players
Cape Town City F.C. (2016) players
AmaZulu F.C. players
South African soccer players
Association football defenders
South Africa international soccer players
South Africa A' international soccer players
2014 African Nations Championship players